Drodro is a refugee camp in Djugu territory, located in the Ituri province of the Democratic Republic of the Congo.

History

Second Congo war 
On July 1, 2003, a few months before the end of the Second Congo War, armed forces were responsible for the mass murder of 966 people in Drodro and the surrounding localities.

2017 

In 2017, the ethnic Lendu priest Florent Dhunji died during his visit to Drodro Parish (which is mostly composed of the Hema people), leading to an upsurge of ethnic tensions in the Ituri conflict as Lendus charged Hema abbots with murdering Dhunji.

2018 
On March 1, 2018, ethnic conflict broke out again in Drodro, this time over land disputes.

2021 massacre 

On November 21, 2021, under the cover of night, the Cooperative for Development of the Congo (CODECO) raided the settlement, leading to the massacre of numerous residents.

During the massacre, the perpetrators inflicted heavy damage against civilians, killing a reported 35 civilians inside the local church and burning down 1,200 shelters.

Congolese Armed Forces spokesman, Jules Ngongo, initially confirmed that at least 12 people had been confirmed dead, but the number of dead was later risen to 44.

References 

Populated places in Ituri Province
Refugee camps in Africa